Lawrence S. Phillips (March 20, 1927 – September 11, 2015) was an American businessman who was chairman of Phillips-Van Heusen until 1995.

Biography
Phillips was born to a Jewish family, the son of Madelyn (née) Shapiro and Seymour Phillips. His great-grandfather, Moses Phillips, was the founder of the family business selling t-shirts out of a cart to coal miners in Pottsville, Pennsylvania; the business was then taken over by his son Isaac Philipps and then by Lawrence's father, Seymour. He has a sister, Carol Philipps Nash Green.  He was a graduate of Princeton University. He was on the boards of Petsmart and the Fashion Institute of Technology in New York. He was the founder and chairman of the American Jewish World Service.

Personal life
Philipps married twice. Both his marriages ended in divorce. His first wife was Anne Phillips; they had two children Laura Phillips Black and David L. Phillips. In 1993, he married Roxane Frechie in a nondenominational ceremony at the Graceland Wedding Chapel in Las Vegas, Nevada. His son is an author and activist.

His political activity earned him a place on the master list of Richard Nixon's political opponents.

References

External links
Staff report (June 28, 1973). Lists of White House 'Enemies' and Memorandums Relating to Those Named. New York Times
Thomas, Landon Jr. (February 24, 2004). Charles Benenson, Developer And Philanthropist, Dies at 91. New York Times
Strom, Stephanie (February 15, 1995). COMPANY NEWS; The Last Phillips Retires From Phillips-Van Heusen. New York Times

Records of the Watergate Special Prosecution Force 1971 to 1977 via National Archives and Records Administration

1927 births
2015 deaths
20th-century American Jews
Fashion Institute of Technology people
Princeton University alumni
21st-century American Jews